Meitei deities are the deities affiliated to Meitei mythology and Meitei religion (Sanamahism) of the Meitei people of Manipur. Among many gods, main Meitei gods are Atingkok, Asheeba (Sanamahi) and Apanba (Pakhangba). Among many goddesses, main Meitei goddesses are Leimarel Sidabi, Imoinu (Emoinu), Panthoibi and Phouoibi (Phouleima).

List of deities

External links

References